The 2013–14 New Hampshire Wildcats men's basketball team  represented the University of New Hampshire during the 2013–14 NCAA Division I men's basketball season. The Wildcats, led by ninth year head coach Bill Herrion, played their home games at Lundholm Gym and were members of the America East Conference. They finished the season 6–24, 4–12 in American East play to finish in a three way tie for seventh place. They lost in the quarterfinals of the American East tournament to Vermont.

Roster

Schedule

|-
!colspan=9 style="background:#191970; color:#FFFFFF;"| Regular season

|-
!colspan=9 style="background:#191970; color:#FFFFFF;"| 2014 America East tournament

References

New Hampshire
New Hampshire Wildcats men's basketball seasons
New Hampshire Wildcats men's basketball
New Hampshire Wildcats men's basketball